The Chinese Elm cultivar Ulmus parvifolia 'Pendens' was listed by Rehder in Journal of the Arnold Arboretum 26: 473, 1872 as Ulmus parvifolia f. pendens.

Description
The tree is described as having long, loosely pendulous branches.

Pests and diseases
The species and its cultivars are highly resistant, but not immune, to Dutch elm disease, and unaffected by the Elm Leaf Beetle Xanthogaleruca luteola.

Cultivation
'Pendens' originated in California before 1930 from seed received from China, but is not known to have been released to commerce.

Synonymy
Ulmus parvifolia f. pendens.
Ulmus parvifolia f. sempervirens

Accessions

North America

Arnold Arboretum. Acc. no. 70–45

References

Chinese elm cultivar
Ulmus articles missing images
Ulmus